is a Japanese manufacturer of components for automobiles, electronics, and telecommunications industries. It also sells printing equipment, power tools, and builders' hardware.  Ryobi Power Tools and Ryobi Outdoor Power Equipment are brands of Techtronic Industries, used under license from Ryobi Limited.

History
The Ryobi Seisakusho Co., Ltd., was founded in Japan in 1943 and began selling die-cast products in 1944. In 1961, the company began manufacturing offset printing presses and was listed on the Tokyo Stock Exchange. Ryobi began production of power tools in 1968. The company's name changed in 1973 to Ryobi, Ltd. 

Ryobi operates 12 manufacturing facilities across six countries.  In 1985, Ryobi launched production in Shelbyville, Indiana, its only manufacturing location in the United States. Ryobi signed an official partnership deal with German football team Hertha Berlin in 2014. In 1991, Ryobi launched production in Carrickfergus, N. Ireland.

U.S. operations
Ryobi Die Casting (USA), Inc., is a Shelbyville, Indiana, manufacturer of products for the automobile industry.

Ryobi Finance Corp. is a financial-operations company of the Ryobi Group located in Chicago, Illinois.

References

External links

 Official website

Manufacturing companies of Japan
Printing press manufacturers
Power tool manufacturers
Companies listed on the Tokyo Stock Exchange
Companies based in Hiroshima Prefecture
Japanese companies established in 1943
Manufacturing companies established in 1943
Japanese brands
The Home Depot
Multinational companies headquartered in Japan
Tool manufacturing companies of Japan